Dolicholobium is a genus of flowering plants in the family Rubiaceae. The genus is found from central Malesia to the southwestern Pacific.

Species 
Dolicholobium aciculatum Burkill - Solomon Islands
Dolicholobium barbatum M.E.Jansen - D'Entrecasteaux Islands
Dolicholobium brassii Merr. & L.M.Perry - Solomon Islands
Dolicholobium cordatum M.E.Jansen - Louisiade Archipelago
Dolicholobium crassicarpum M.E.Jansen - Papua New Guinea
Dolicholobium forbesii Wernham - Papua New Guinea
Dolicholobium gertrudis K.Schum. - Papuasia
Dolicholobium glabrum M.E.Jansen - Solomon Islands
Dolicholobium graciliflorum Valeton - Papua New Guinea
Dolicholobium leptocarpum Merr. & L.M.Perry - New Guinea
Dolicholobium linearilobum M.E.Jansen - Papua New Guinea
Dolicholobium longifructum M.E.Jansen - Louisiade Archipelago, Woodlark Island
Dolicholobium macgregorii Horne ex Baker - Fiji
Dolicholobium minutilobum M.E.Jansen - Santa Isabel Island
Dolicholobium moluccense M.E.Jansen - Maluku Islands
Dolicholobium nakiki M.E.Jansen - Bismarck Archipelago
Dolicholobium oblongifolium A.Gray - Fiji, Vanuatu
Dolicholobium oxylobum K.Schum. & Lauterb. - New Guinea
Dolicholobium parviflorum M.E.Jansen - Bougainville Island
Dolicholobium peekelii Valeton - Bismarck Archipelago
Dolicholobium philippinense Trel. - Philippines
Dolicholobium rheophilum M.E.Jansen - Louisiade Archipelago
Dolicholobium ridsdalei M.E.Jansen - Bougainville Island
Dolicholobium riuense M.E.Jansen - Louisiade Archipelago
Dolicholobium rubrum Schltr. ex Valeton - Papua New Guinea
Dolicholobium rufiflorum S.Moore - Papua New Guinea
Dolicholobium seruiense M.E.Jansen - Yapen
Dolicholobium solomonense Merr. & L.M.Perry - Solomon Islands, Vanuatu

References

External links 
 Dolicholobium in the World Checklist of Rubiaceae

Rubiaceae genera
Dialypetalantheae